Joseph Zuzarte Murumbi (18 June 1911 – 22 June 1990) was a Kenyan politician who was the Minister of Foreign Affairs of the Republic of Kenya from 1964 to 1966, and its second Vice-President between May and December 1966.

Early life
He was born Joseph Murumbi-Zuzarte. He was the illegitimate son of a Goan trader, Peter Nicholas Zuzarte, by the daughter of a Maasai medicine man. His parents broke up when he was a toddler. His father married a Goan widow named Ezalda Clara Albuquerque, who already had nine children. He was then sent away to India for his schooling at the age of six. He went to Good Shepherd Convent School and then St. Joseph's High School, both in Bangalore. He completed his schooling at St. Pancras European Boys High School in Bellary.

Political career
After returning to Kenya from England where he had worked as a translator for the Moroccan Embassy in London, Murumbi became a member of the Kenya African Union political party, amidst a political ferment in East Africa caused by the beginning of the withdrawal from the African continent of the British Empire. A declaration of the State of Emergency in Kenya on 20 October 1952 saw the detention of senior figures of the Kenya African Union's leadership, and Murumbi found himself thrust into the center of the party's leadership as its acting Secretary-General. He played a key role in securing legal counsel for the detainees arrested in the emergency crackdown, and, together with Pio Gama Pinto, raised objection to the continuance of British Imperial dominion in Kenya through Indian newspapers such as the Chronicle.

Ministerial career
After Kenya became independent of British imperial rule in 1963, Murumbi participated in the writing of its first governmental constitution, and held the office of its Minister of Foreign Affairs from 1964 to 1966, touring the globe to set up numerous ambassadorial offices in foreign capitals for the newly created nation. He subsequently served as the Republic's Vice-President in a government led by Jomo Kenyatta in 1966 for nine months. However, around this time Murumbi became uneasy with what he perceived as Kenyatta's increasing authoritarianism in dealing with political opponents, and the increasing corruption that he witnessed rapidly developing within the new Kenyan Government order, and subsequently his concerns were borne out as when Kenyatta began to use government power to engage in land grabbing in the late 1960s and 1970s. Murumbi also became further alienated from the new Kenyan governing order when Pio Gama Pinto, a close personal friend and key political philosophical mentor of Murumbi's, was murdered in April 1965 after he had become a public critic of it. As Pheroze Nowrojee stated:

The assassination of Pinto illustrated to Murumbi the shocking extent to which the new government had departed from its promises. His feeling, evidently, was that these were not the principles for which so many had suffered, and his departure (from the new political order in power) was only a matter of time.

After resigning from the office of the Vice-President in November 1966 through what was announced officially at the time to be on account of ill health, Murumbi withdrew from politics.

Later life
After leaving politics Murumbi became the Acting-Chairman of the Kenyan National Archives, and later co-founded 'African Heritage' with Alan Donovan, which went on to become the largest Pan-African art gallery on the continent.

Death
In 1982 he seriously injured himself in a fall at his home, and was reliant upon a wheel-chair in his final years. He died on 22 June 1990 in his 79th year. Murumbi's body was buried in Nairobi City Park. The unmarked grave was subject to neglect, vandalism and theft through the late 1990s and early 2000s, and had at one time been threatened with being lost trace of altogether when a building development scheme was considered for the site of the grave, until it was protected by the creation around it of a memorial garden named after him.

Personal life
Murumbi married Shelia, a librarian whom he met whilst he was a political exile from Kenya in England in the late 1950s. They lived in Kenya subsequently on an estate in the Muthaiga district. She died in 2000.

Legacy
He was an avid art collector, and during his life acquired over 50,000 books and sheaves of official correspondence. The Kenya National Archives established a library containing some of the 8000 rare books (published before 1900) entrusted to them upon the death of Murumbi. The Kenya National Archives also created the 'Murumbi Gallery' within the same building, displaying the different African artifacts that were collected by him through his lifelife.

References

External links
 The East African Standard Gentle Dissident
 Muriithi Mutiga  The East African Standard, archived 2006-03-23.

1911 births
1990 deaths
Kenyan people of Indian descent
Vice-presidents of Kenya
Kenya African National Union politicians
Government ministers of Kenya
Kenyan people of Goan descent
Burials in Kenya